The Women's 25 metre air pistol took place on 13 April 2018 at the Belmont Shooting Centre, Brisbane. There was a qualification in which the top 8 athletes qualified for the finals.

Results

Qualification

Finals

References

Shooting at the 2018 Commonwealth Games
Comm